Ervin A. Dennis (born October 6, 1936) is an American politician in the state of Iowa.

Dennis was born in Lyons, Nebraska. He attended Northeast Community College, the University of Northern Colorado, and Texas A&M University and was an academic, and former professor at the University of Northern Iowa. A Republican, he served in the Iowa House of Representatives from 2003 to 2005 (19th district).

References

1936 births
Living people
People from Lyons, Nebraska
Texas A&M University alumni
University of Northern Colorado alumni
University of Northern Iowa faculty
Republican Party members of the Iowa House of Representatives